Schaffhausen, historically known in English as Shaffhouse, is a town with historic roots, a municipality in northern Switzerland, and the capital of the canton of the same name; it has an estimated population of 36,000  It is located right next to the shore of the High Rhine; it is one of four Swiss towns located on the northern side of the Rhine, along with , the historic , and .

The old town has many fine Renaissance era buildings decorated with exterior frescos and sculpture, as well as the old canton fortress, the Munot. Schaffhausen is also a railway junction of Swiss and German rail networks.

The official language of Schaffhausen is (the Swiss variety of Standard) German, but the main spoken language is the local variant of the Alemannic Swiss German dialect.

Name 
The town is first mentioned in 1045 as Villa Scafhusun. There are at least two theories on the origin of this name:

 One relates to a mention of a "ford" across the Rhine that first occurs in 1050. This "ford" may actually refer to a scapha or skiff which was used to disembark goods coming from Constance to move them around the Rhine Falls. The name Scafhusun then arose from the scapha used at that point.
 Another theory is that Scafhusun comes from Schaf (a sheep), as a ram (now a sheep) formed the ancient arms (traceable to 1049) of the town, derived from those of its founders, the counts of Nellenburg.

Coat of arms
The blazon of the municipal coat of arms is Or on a Base Vert issuant from sinister a Semi Castle Argent with tower with entrance from which is issuing a Semi Ram Sable. The canting coat of arms refers to the second interpretation of the name, sheep-house.

History 

Schaffhausen was a city state in the Middle Ages, documented to have struck its own coins from 1045. About 1050 the counts of Nellenburg founded the Benedictine monastery of All Saints, which became the centre of the town. Perhaps as early as 1190, certainly in 1208, it was an imperial free city, while the first seal dates from 1253. The powers of the abbot were gradually limited and in 1277 the Emperor Rudolf I gave the town a charter of liberties. In 1330 the emperor Louis of Bavaria pledged it to the Habsburgs. In the early 15th century, Habsburg power over the city waned. By 1411 the guilds ruled the city. Then, in 1415 the Habsburg Duke Frederick IV of Austria sided with the Antipope John XXIII at the Council of Constance, and was banned by the Emperor Sigismund. As a result of the ban and Frederick's need of money, Schaffhausen was able to buy its independence from the Habsburgs in 1418. The city allied with six of the Swiss confederates in 1454 and allied with a further two (Uri and Unterwalden) in 1479. Schaffhausen became a full member of the Old Swiss Confederacy in 1501.

The Reformation was adopted, initially, in 1524 and completely in 1529. The town was heavily damaged during the Thirty Years' War by the passage of Swedish (Protestant) and Bavarian (Roman Catholic) troops and the very important bridge was burnt down. It was not until the early 19th century that the arrested industrial development of the town recommenced. In 1857, the first railroad, the Rheinfallbahn, running from Winterthur, reached Schaffhausen.

Schaffhausen is located in a finger of Swiss territory surrounded on three sides by Germany. On 1 April 1944, Schaffhausen suffered a bombing raid by aircraft of the United States Army Air Forces, which strayed from German airspace into neutral Switzerland due to navigation errors. Air raid sirens had often sounded in the past, without an actual attack, so many residents ignored the sirens that day. A total of 40 civilians were killed in the raid. President Franklin Delano Roosevelt sent a personal letter of apology to the mayor of Schaffhausen and the United States quickly offered four million US dollars in reparations.

Geography and climate

Topography
The town of Schaffhausen stands on the right bank of the river Rhine. Of this area, about 20.2% is used for agricultural purposes, while 53.4% is forested. Of the rest of the land, 24.8% is settled (buildings or roads) and 1.6% is unproductive land.

In 1947 it merged with the former municipality of Buchthalen. Its area expanded again in 1964 when Herblingen was absorbed and for a third time in 2009 when Hemmental joined the municipality.

Schaffhausen shares an international border with the German village of Büsingen am Hochrhein, an exclave entirely surrounded by Switzerland.

Climate
Schaffhausen has an average of 122.5 days of rain or snow per year and on average receives  of precipitation. During this month there is precipitation for an average of 11.3 days.

Politics

Government
The City Council (de: Stadtrat) constitutes the executive government of the town of Schaffhausen and operates as a collegiate authority. It is composed of five councilors, each presiding over a department (Referat), which each consists of several administrative districts. The president of the executive department acts as mayor (Stadtpräsident(in)). In the mandate period January 2017 – December 2020 (Amtsdauer) the City Council is presided by Stadtpräsident Peter Neukomm. Departmental tasks, coordination measures and implementation of laws decreed by the Grand City Council (parliament) are carried by the City Council. The regular election of the City Council by any inhabitant valid to vote is held every four years. Any resident of Schaffhausen allowed to vote can be elected as a member of the City Council. The mayor is elected as such as well by public election while the heads of the other directorates are assigned by the collegiate. The mayor as well as the delegates are elected by means of a system of Majorz.

, Schaffhausen's City Council is made up of one representative of the SP (Social Democratic Party, who is also the mayor), one representative of the AL (Alternative List), one of the FDP (The Liberals), one of the SVP (Swiss People's Party), and one of the GLP (Green Liberal Party), giving the right parties a majority of three out of five seats. The last regular election was held on 28 August 2016.

Parliament

The Grand City Council (Grosser Stadtrat) holds legislative power. It is made up of 36 members, with elections held every four years. The Grand City Council decrees regulations and by-laws that are executed by the City Council and the administration. The delegates are selected by means of a system of Proporz.

The sessions of the Grand City Council are public. Unlike members of the City Council, members of the Grand City Council are not politicians by profession, and they are paid a fee based on their attendance. Any resident of Schaffhausen allowed to vote can be elected as a member of the Grand City Council. The parliament holds its meetings in the Kantonsratsaal (Cantonal Council Hall) am Kornmarkt.

The last regular election of the Grand City Council was held on 27 November 2016 for the mandate period from January 2017 to December 2020. Currently the Grand City Council consist of 9 Swiss People's Party (SVP/UDC), 8 members of the Social Democratic Party (SP/PS) and one of its junior section, the JUSOplus, 5 The Liberals (FDP/PLR) and one of its junior section, the JFSH, 4 Alternative List (AL), 3 Green Liberal Party (GLP/PVL), 2 ÖBS-Grüne (an alliance of the Ökoliberale Bewegung Schaffhausen (ÖBS) and the Green Party (GPS/PES)), and one each of Christian Democratic People's Party (CVP/PDC), Evangelical People's Party (EVP/PES), and Federal Democratic Union (EDU/UDF).

National elections
 National Council
In the 2015 federal election the most popular party was the SVP with 39.0% of the vote. The next three most popular parties were the SP (34.0%), the FDP (12.7%) and the others (6.7%). In the federal election, a total of 13,754 votes were cast, and the voter turnout was 60.7%. The 2015 election saw a change in the voting when compared to 2011. The percentage that the SP received dropped from 41.6% to 34.0% while the SVP increased from 31.9% in 2011 to 39.0% in 2015.

Demographics

Population
, 27.9% of the population are resident foreign nationals. Of the foreign population,, 21% are from Germany, 13.3% are from Italy, 8.8% are from Croatia, 13.3% are from Serbia, 6% are from Macedonia, 9% are from Turkey, and 28.6% are from other countries. Most of the population speaks German (84.3%), with Serbo-Croatian being second most common (3.4%) and Italian being third (3.2%).

Over the last 4 years (2010-2014) the population has changed at a rate of 2.82%. The birth rate in the municipality, in 2014, was 9.6, while the death rate was 10.1 per thousand residents.

, children and teenagers (0–19 years old) make up 17.8% of the population, while adults (20–64 years old) are 61.7% and seniors (over 64 years old) make up 20.5%. In 2015 there were 15,288 single residents, 15,287 people who were married or in a civil partnership, 2,119 widows or widowers, 3,253 divorced residents and 1 people who did not answer the question.

In 2014 there were 16,723 private households in Schaffhausen with an average household size of 2.10 persons. Of the 5,863 inhabited buildings in the municipality, in 2000, about 51.5% were single family homes and 29.7% were multiple family buildings. Additionally, about 22.1% of the buildings were built before 1919, while 7.6% were built between 1991 and 2000. In 2013 the rate of construction of new housing units per 1000 residents was 1.29. The vacancy rate for the municipality, was 0.71%.

 Historic population
The historical population is given in the following chart:

Religion
, 27.4% of the population belonged to the Roman Catholic Church and 43.6% belonged to the Swiss Reformed Church, later organized in the parish St. Johann – Münster.

Education
In Schaffhausen about 69.8% of the population (between age 25–64) have completed either non-mandatory upper secondary education or additional higher education (either university or a Fachhochschule (university of applied sciences)). In Schaffhausen, 1.73% of the population attend kindergarten or another pre-school, 5.65% attend a Primary School, 2.98% attend a lower level Secondary School, and 2.49% attend a higher level Secondary School.

Economy
, there were a total of 25,749 people employed in the municipality. Of these, a total of 103 people worked in 24 businesses in the primary economic sector. A majority (61.2%) of the primary sector employees worked in very small businesses (less than ten employees). The remainder worked in 2 small businesses with a total of 40 employees. The secondary sector employed 6,403 workers in 371 separate businesses. In 2014 a total of 2,433 employees worked in 358 small companies (less than 50 employees). There were 13 mid sized businesses with 1,631 employees and 3 large businesses which employed 2,333 people (for an average size of 777.7). Finally, the tertiary sector provided 19,243 jobs in 2,626 businesses. In 2014 the tertiary sector numbers had increased by 606 and 20 respectively. In 2014 a total of 12,890 employees worked in 2,597 small companies (less than 50 employees). There were 45 mid sized businesses with 4,938 employees and 4 large businesses which employed 2,021 people (for an average size of 505.3).

In 2014 a total of 1.3% of the population received social assistance.

In 2015 local hotels had a total of 102,537 overnight stays, of which 52.6% were international visitors. In 2015 there were two movie theaters in the municipality, with a total of 10 screens and a total of 1,816 available seats. , there are 102 restaurants, and 11 hotels with 445 beds. The catering industry in Schaffhausen employs 924 people.

 the mid year average unemployment rate was 2.5%. There were 1,879 non-agrarian businesses in the municipality and 29.9% of the (non-agrarian) population was involved in the secondary sector of the economy while 70.1% were involved in the third. At the same time, 67.1% of the working population was employed full-time, and 32.9% was employed part-time. There were 21,841 residents of the municipality who were employed in some capacity, of which women made up 46.6% of the workforce.  there were 10,019 residents who worked in the municipality, while 5,724 residents worked outside Schaffhausen and 8,026 people commuted into the municipality for work.

Schaffhausen has an unemployment rate, of 2.67%. , there were 196 people employed in the primary economic sector and about 33 businesses involved in this sector. 6,488 people are employed in the secondary sector and there are 293 businesses in this sector. 14,019 people are employed in the tertiary sector, with 1,486 businesses in this sector.

Transportation

Train 

The town of Schaffhausen is served by two railway stations, Schaffhausen railway station and  Herblingen railway station.

Schaffhausen railway station is jointly owned by the Swiss Federal Railways (SBB) and Deutsche Bahn (DB), and is served by trains of both nation's networks. The station is served by long-distance passenger trains (InterCity, IC) running between Stuttgart and Zurich, RegioExpress (RE) trains between Zürich HB and Schaffhausen, and Interregio-Express (IRE) trains between Basel and Friedrichshafen. Trains of Zurich S-Bahn services S9, S12, S24 and S33 serve the station, although only the S24 provides a direct service to Zürich Airport and Zürich main station. In addition, the S1 service of St. Gallen S-Bahn operates over the Lake Line to St. Gallen and Wil.

Services are summarized as follows:

 DB Fernverkehr / SBB CFF FFS IC 4: hourly service between Zürich HB and Stuttgart Hbf (via ).
 IRE: hourly service between Basel Bad Bf and Friedrichshafen Hafen (via ).
 St. Gallen S-Bahn:
 Zürich S-Bahn:
  (operated by THURBO):

Bus 

Schaffhausen and the neighboring town of Neuhausen am Rheinfall have an urban bus network of 8 lines, including the Schaffhausen trolleybus system (line 1). Since 2019, the other lines (3–9) are operated by battery-powerd buses (Irizar) and diesel-powered buses. All routes except line 9 call at Schaffhausen railway station. Route 9 calls at Herblingen railway station. During weekends, there are night buses (designated as N#) operating after midnight. The urban bus routes, all operated by Verkehrsbetriebe Schaffhausen (vbsh), are as follows:

One of the previous urban routes, line 12 to the Rhine Falls, was the first route ever to feature a level 5 autonomous bus (2018-2019).

In addition, there are several regional bus services that link Schaffhausen with villages in the canton of Schaffhausen, the canton of Zurich and nearby German territory. The regional bus services 21–25, lines 630 and 634 and all night bus services (designated with N#) all depart from the forecourt of Schaffhausen railway station:

Boat 

Departing from Schifflände, there are regular boat trips on the River Rhine (High Rhine) to Stein am Rhein and Kreuzlingen (Lake Constance) offered by Schweizerische Schifffahrtsgesellschaft Untersee und Rhein (URh) during warmer seasons.

Private Transport 
The A4 motorway connects Schaffhausen with Zürich. The A4 continues northward to Donaueschingen/Singen (Hohentwiel) in Germany. Since 1996, the A4 runs through a tunnel, bypassing the town's center. There are three nearby exits along the A4: Schaffhausen Süd, Schaffhausen Nord and Schaffhausen Schweizersbild.

The Hauptstrasse 13 connects Schaffhausen with villages in the western part of the canton (Klettgau), through the Galgenbucktunnel which opened in 2019, and with villages along the Rhine River east of Schaffhausen.

Culture
 Heritage sites of national significance
There are 35 buildings or sites in Schaffhausen that are listed as Swiss heritage sites of national significance. This includes the entire old town of Schaffhausen, the city walls, the Giesserei +GF+ Werk I factory, the town and cantonal archives, the Schweizersbild Paleolithic cave and the Herblingen and Grüthalde Neolithic settlements. Additionally, there are four former guild houses and seven listed houses. There are only two listed religious buildings, the former Benedictine All Saints Abbey and the Church of St. John.

Economy
Schaffhausen hosts some well-known industrial companies like Georg Fischer (piping systems, machine tools and automotives), an internationally reputed manufacturer of watches (IWC), pharmaceutical industry (Cilag, founded by Bernhard Joos) and BB Biotech (biotechnologies). Tyco International, Garmin, and cyber protection company Acronis are also incorporated in Schaffhausen.

Sport 
The town has two football teams, SV Schaffhausen, of the fourth-tier Swiss 1. Liga, and FC Schaffhausen, of the second-tier Swiss Challenge League. There is a football stadium in Breite, Schaffhausen which seats 4200 persons, known as the Breitestadion. It is also the training headquarters for local children's football teams.

There is a handball team in Schaffhausen which plays in the first Swiss division: Kadetten Schaffhausen. They are centered at the BBC Arena on Schweizersbildstrasse. It seats 3600 persons, and was built in 2011. Kadetten has been very successful and has won the second most titles in the history of the SHL.

Notable people

Pre-17th C 
 Bernold of Constance (c.1054 – 1100 in Schaffhausen), a chronicler and writer of religious tracts
 Johann Geiler von Kaisersberg (1445–1510), a priest, a popular preacher of the 15th C.
 Sebastian Hofmeister (1476–1533), known in writing as Oeconomus or Oikonomos, was a Swiss monk and religious Reformer 
 Tobias Stimmer (1539–1584), a painter and illustrator, particularly of the Strasbourg astronomical clock
 Daniel Lindtmayer (1552-c.1605), the fourth generation of artists and glass painters

17th C 
 Johann Jakob Wepfer (1620–1695), a pathologist and pharmacologist
 Johann Conrad Peyer (1653–1712), an anatomist
 Johann Konrad Ammann (1669–1724), a physician and instructor of non-verbal deaf persons  
 Andrew Schalch (1692–1776), the first gun-founder at the Royal Arsenal in Woolwich

18th C 
 George Michael Moser RA (1706–1783), a chaser and enameller, co-founder of the Royal Academy in 1768 
 Johann Amman (1707–1741), a Swiss-Russian botanist, a member of the Royal Society and professor of botany
 John Snetzler (1710–1785), an organ builder who worked mostly in England
 Lorenz Spengler (1720–1807), a Danish turner and naturalist. 
 Johann Jakob Schalch (1723–1789), a painter, noted for his paintings of the Rheinfall in Schaffhausen
 Johann Conrad Ammann (1724–1811), a physician, naturalist and collector of fossils
 Johannes von Müller (1752–1809), a historian  
 Johann Conrad Fischer (1773–1854), a metallurgist, inventor, and pioneer in the steel industry; founded Georg Fischer AG in 1802
 Friedrich Emmanuel von Hurter (1787-1865), a Protestant cleric and historian who converted to Roman Catholicism

19th C 
 Johann Heinrich Gelzer (1813-1889), an historian and diplomat
 Hans Bendel (1814–1853), a painter and illustrator
 Ferdinand Hurter (1844–1898), an industrial chemist who settled in England, researched photography
 Dame Sophia Wintz DBE (1847–1929), a British philanthropist who co-founded the Royal Sailors' Rests
 Ernst Homberger (1869–1955), an industrialist, Georg Fischer and International Watch Company
 Emil Ermatinger (1873–1953), a professor for Germanic philology
 Hermann Rorschach (1884–1922), a psychiatrist and psychoanalyst, brought up in Schaffhausen
 Karl Jäger (1888–1959), a mid-ranking official in the SS of Nazi Germany, perpetrated acts of genocide during the Holocaust
 Walther Bringolf (1895–1981), mayor of Schaffhausen 1933–1968, former President of the National Council of Switzerland 1961/1962

20th C 
 Richard Meili (1900-1991), a scientist in practical psychology, diagnostics, personality development and intelligence
 Conrad Beck (1901–1989), a composer and head of Music of Radio Basel 1933-1963
 Carl Alfred Meier (1905–1995), a psychiatrist, Jungian psychologist, scholar, and first president of the C. G. Jung Institute in Zürich
 Cardinal Gilberto Agustoni (1922–2017), a prelate of the Roman Catholic Church
 Ernst Hess (1912–1968), a conductor, composer and musicologist
 Rita Wolfensberger (1928-2020), classical pianist
 Bruno Meyer (born 1938), a religious leader of a fundamentalist Christian, evangelical congregation; convicted in 2010 for rape and child sexual abuse  
 Markus Werner (1944–2016), a writer, author of the novels Zündels Abgang
 Christoph Blocher (born 1940), a politician, industrialist and former member of the Swiss Federal Council 
 Pia Gyger (1940-2014), a specialist for special education and psychologist a co-initiator of the Jerusalem-Project
 Irène Schweizer (born 1941), a jazz and free improvising pianist 
 Jürg Fröhlich (born 1946), a mathematician and theoretical physicist
 Giorgio Behr (born 1948), a businessman, lawyer, accountant and university professor 
 Beat Furrer (born 1954), an Austrian composer and conductor
 Philipp Landmark (born 1966), a journalist and former editor-in-chief of the St. Galler Tagblatt
Tom Strala (born 1974), a designer, architect and artist.

Sport 
 Jules Ehrat (1905–1997), a chess player, the 1942 joint Swiss Chess Champion
 Liselotte Kobi (born 1930), a former swimmer, competed at the 1948 and 1952 Summer Olympics
 Marianne Gossweiler (born 1943), an equestrian, medallist in team dressage at both the 1964 and 1968 Summer Olympics
 Stefan Maurer (1960–1994), a cyclist, competed in the individual road race at the 1984 Summer Olympics
 Stephan Lehmann (1963), a retired football goalkeeper, goalkeeper coach for FC Sion, 538 team games and 14 for the national side
 Roberto Di Matteo (born 1970), an Italian former footballer (323 games) and team manager in the UK
 Daniela Baumer (born 1971), a sprint canoer, silver medallist at the 1996 Summer Olympics
 Florence Schelling (born 1989), an ice hockey goaltender and three-time Olympian; first woman to be named General Manager of a professional men's hockey team (SC Bern) in the world

See also 
 Cholfirst Radio Tower
 List of mayors of Schaffhausen
 Bombing of Schaffhausen in World War II

References

External links 

 
 
Tourism information
Town archives 
Rhine Fall

U.S. Bombings of Switzerland during World War II
Digitized Edition of Chronik der Stadt und Landschaft Schaffhausen, in German, 1884–1910, at E-rara
Digitized Edition of Wappenbuch der Stadt Schaffhausen, in German, Schaffhausen 1819, at E-rara.

 
Cantonal capitals of Switzerland
Cities in Switzerland
Populated places on the Rhine
Municipalities of the canton of Schaffhausen
1330 disestablishments
Populated places disestablished in the 14th century
States and territories established in 1415
Cultural property of national significance in the canton of Schaffhausen
16th-century establishments in the Old Swiss Confederacy
1501 establishments in the Holy Roman Empire